Digby Glen Crozier (born 16 May 1927) is a former Australian politician.

He was born in London to medical practitioner John Edwin Digby Crozier and Nancy Legoe, who were from Adelaide; Nancy's father was Glen Legoe (1864–1951) of George Wilcox & Co; Capt. John Legoe (c. 1824–1895) was a grandfather. He attended Geelong Grammar School and then Caius College, Cambridge, where he received a Master of Arts. From 1945 to 1946 he served in the Royal Australian Navy, and afterwards became a grazier near Casterton. On 20 April 1957 he married Mary Jill Salter; they had four children. He was a councillor at Glenelg from 1965 to 1973, serving as president from 1967 to 1968. In 1973 he was elected to the Victorian Legislative Council as a Liberal member for Western. He was appointed Minister for State Development, Decentralisation and Tourism in 1976, moving to Local Government in 1979 and to Minerals and Energy in 1981. He was also deputy Liberal leader in the upper house from 1978 to 1979. Following the defeat of the government in 1982 he was the spokesman on minerals and energy, and in 1985 he transferred to the Legislative Assembly, winning the seat of Portland. He was Shadow Minister for Police and Emergency Services from 1985 to 1988, when he retired from politics.

His daughter, Georgie Crozier, has been a Liberal member of the Victorian Legislative Council since 2010, and Parliamentary Secretary for Health since 2013.

References

1927 births
Living people
Liberal Party of Australia members of the Parliament of Victoria
Members of the Victorian Legislative Council
Members of the Victorian Legislative Assembly
People educated at Geelong Grammar School
Royal Australian Navy personnel of World War II